Promalactis scorpioidea is a moth of the family Oecophoridae. It is found in Jiangxi, China.

The wingspan is about 11.5-13.5 mm. The forewings are ochreous brown to ferrugineous. The costal margin black along the basal quarter. The markings are white edged with black scales. The hindwings and cilia are dark grey.

Etymology
The specific name is derived from Latin scorpioideus (meaning like the tail of a scorpion) and refers to the sacculus curved distally like the tail of a scorpion.

References

Moths described in 2013
Oecophorinae
Insects of China